USLHT Azalea was an American lighthouse tender that operated in the fleet of the United States Lighthouse Board from 1891 to 1910 and of the United States Lighthouse Service from 1910 to 1917 and from 1919 to 1933. During and in the immediate aftermath of World War I, she served in the United States Navy as USS Azalea from 1917 to 1919. During World War II, she became the U.S. Navy seaplane tender  in 1942.

U.S. Lighthouse Board and U.S. Lighthouse Service, 1910–1917
Built in 1891 for the United States Lighthouse Board as USLHT Azalea, Azalea assigned to the Second Lighthouse District and based at Woods Hole, Massachusetts. In 1910, when the Lighthouse Board was abolished and replaced by the United States Lighthouse Service, she became part of the Lighthouse Service fleet.

U.S. Navy, 1917–1919
The United States entered World War I on 6 April 1917, and the Lighthouse Service transferred Azalea to the United States Navy for war service on 16 April 1917. The Navy commissioned her 9 May 1917. In Navy service, she salvaged navigational aids, adjusted buoys, and tended anti-submarine nets. The war ended on 11 November 1918, and the Navy returned her to the Lighthouse Service on 1 July 1919.

U.S. Lighthouse Service, 1919–1933
Once again USLHT Azalea, the ship returned to duty in the Second Lighthouse District. She collided with the schooner Lavinia M. Snow off Pollock Rip Shoal near Monomoy Island in Chatham, Massachusetts, in 1921 but was repaired and returned to service. The Lighthouse Service decommissioned and sold her in 1933.

U.S. Navy, 1942
The United States entered World War II on 7 December 1942, and the U.S. Navy reacquired the ship in August 1942.

See also

References

Further reading
 United States Coast Guard, Aids to Navigation, (Washington, DC: U. S. Government Printing Office, 1945).
 
 Putnam, George R., Lighthouses and Lightships of the United States, (Boston: Houghton Mifflin Co., 1933).

Service vessels of the United States
Ships of the United States Lighthouse Service
Tenders of the United States Navy
World War I auxiliary ships of the United States
Lighthouse tenders of the United States
Maritime incidents in 1921